Ross Robinson (6 December 1906 – 22 December 1992) was a Canadian speed skater. He competed in three events at the 1928 Winter Olympics.

References

1906 births
1992 deaths
Canadian male speed skaters
Olympic speed skaters of Canada
Speed skaters at the 1928 Winter Olympics
Sportspeople from Toronto